General elections were held in Burkina Faso on 22 November 2020 to elect the President and National Assembly. In the presidential elections, incumbent president Roch Marc Christian Kaboré of the People's Movement for Progress was re-elected in the first round with 57.7% of the vote, avoiding the need for second round. The main campaign focus of the major presidential candidates was the growing insecurity in the country with the rise in terrorism and ethnic violence.

Electoral system
The President is elected using the two-round system; if no candidate receives a majority of the vote in the first round, a second round will be held. 

The 127 members of the National Assembly are elected by proportional representation; 111 are elected from 45 multi-member constituencies with between two and nine seats, with 16 elected from a single nationwide constituency.

Campaign
In February 2019 former Prime Minister Kadré Désiré Ouédraogo announced that he would contest the presidential elections.

Conduct
Due to instability, the election commission was unable to conduct voter registration in more than 17% of the country. Fifty-two out of 127 members of parliament suggested that they would not be able to campaign in their constituency due to security concerns. With increased pressure from the government not to postpone the elections, the National Assembly passed a bill on 24 August to introduce a force majeure clause. The clause allowed the elections to continue as normal and in areas where insecurity limited the vote from being held, the results from polling stations that were able to open dictated the result for the entire constituency. At the start of the campaign period, municipalities in six of the thirteen regions had cases of force majeure.

The COVID-19 pandemic also prevented voter registrations between 30 March and 25 May. 

On election day, voting did not take place in 926 of the 19,836 polling stations, disenfranchising 596,756 registered voters.

Results

President

National Assembly

Aftermath
Although the opposition accused the government of committing electoral fraud before and after the election, on 27 November opposition leader Zephirin Diabre conceded defeat and met with Kabore to congratulate him on his re-election. The opposition failed to produce substantial evidence of electoral fraud and the election commission quickly dismissed the claims of irregularities. Observers considered the election fair. In the country's east, there was a minor incident as 30 people voted using fake ballot papers as there were not any "original" ballot papers available. However, Halidou Ouedraogo, President of local election monitoring organization CODEL said that it was not a widespread phenomenon and gave the election a mostly clean bill.

References

Burkina
General election
Elections in Burkina Faso
Burkina
Presidential elections in Burkina Faso